Murda Muzik is the fourth studio album by Mobb Deep, which was released on August 17, 1999 through Columbia Records and Loud Records. It features one of the group's best-known tracks, "Quiet Storm." It is also the duo's most commercially successful album to date, for shipping over 1 million copies in the United States and was certified Platinum by the RIAA on October 26, 1999, debuting at #3 on the Billboard 200 charts. Murda Muzik also garnered positive reviews from The Source and Allmusic, among others. A censored version of the album, titled Mobb Muzik, was released simultaneously. Since its release the album has been certified 2× platinum.

Background 
The release of Murda Muzik was originally planned for the beginning of 1999, but Loud Records switched distributors from RCA to Columbia. Murda Muzik was shelved until this deal was finalized. Within this time the album was heavily bootlegged and Mobb Deep had to record new songs to make sure fans would still buy the album. The duo recorded 5 new songs:

 Spread Love
 I'm Going Out (featuring Lil' Cease)
 Can't Fuck Wit (featuring Raekwon)
 It's Mine (featuring Nas)
 Quiet Storm (Remix) (featuring Lil' Kim)

These songs replaced earlier recorded tracks.

Critical reception

Bootleg tracks 
Murda Muzik leaked in early 1999. The following tracks were on multiple bootlegs that didn't make the final cut.

Full tracks:
 Feel My Gat Blow
 Thrill Me (featuring Big Noyd)
 3 The Hard Way (featuring Big Noyd) = also called "You Fuckin’ Wit" and "3 From NYC"
 This One (featuring Big Noyd) = also called "Pyramid Points."
 Perfect Plot (featuring Big Noyd) = also called "Mobb Coming Thru" and "We Got The Drop"
 Pile Raps = also called Power Rap 
 Nobody Likes Me
 Shiesty (featuring Big Noyd) = also called "Fuck That Bitch" 
 QB Meets Southside" (featuring Sticky Fingaz and X-1) 
Remixes of retail tracks:
 Deer Park ft. Cormega (What's Ya Poison with intro) = also called "How You Want It"
 Hoe Gonna Be a Hoe with intro
 Streets Raised Me (OG Mix) (also called "That True Shit") = different sounding hook. There supposedly is also a version where children are singing the hook.
 Street Kingz (featuring Nas) = U.S.A. (Aiight Then) with a Nas verse. Colombia didn't want to clear Nas for two songs.  They had to cut his verse from U.S.A. (Aiight then) since he also appears on the It's Mine song.  
 White Lines (Quiet Storm without Havoc on the hook). Prodigy talked in between verses, it was mastered in a way that this talking sounded like it came out of a megaphone.
 Thug Muzik = Has a verse of Mike Delorean from Bars & Hooks instead of Prodigy.
 Murda Muzik = Longer track with a final verse from Prodigy that ultimately ended up on Thug Muzik in the retail release. There's also a version without that final verse but a freestyle from Cormega instead.

Track listing
Credits adapted from the album's liner notes.

Samples
Intro
"Crime Inc. Theme" by Giles Swayne
contains an excerpt from a speech of Ronald Reagan
Adrenaline
"Ballad Of The Decomposing Man" by Steve Hackett
Where Ya Heart At
"Fear" by Sade
It's Mine
"The Boy Is Mine" by Brandy & Monica (interpolation)
"Scarface Cues" by Giorgio Moroder
Quiet Storm
"White Lines (Don't Do It)" by Grandmaster Melle Mel
"A Quiet Storm" by Smokey Robinson
The Realest
"Born to Lose" by Ecstasy, Passion & Pain
I'm Going Out
"Farewell" by Miklos Rozsa
Thug Muzik
"The Toys" by George Winston and Meryl Streep
What's Ya Poison
"1000 Rads" by David Axelrod
Where Ya From
"The Champ" by The Mohawks
Quiet Storm (Remix)
"10% Dis" by MC Lyte

Charts

Weekly charts

Year-end charts

Certifications

References

External links
 

Mobb Deep albums
1999 albums
Loud Records albums
Albums produced by the Alchemist (musician)
Albums produced by Havoc (musician)